Anchoromicrocotylinae is a subfamily within  family Microcotylidae and class Monogenea. This subfamily was created by Bravo-Hollis in 1981, to accommodate Monogeneans recovered from the gills of Atractoscion nobilis (Sciaenidae) (synonym of Cynoscion nobilis ) caught off California. In the same work, Bravo-Hollis in 1981 created the new genus Anchoromicrocotyle  and amended the diagnosis of the family Microcotylidae. 
Members of Anchoromicrocotylinae differ from other Microcotylidae by the presence of a larval organ and larval hooks and the structure of the genital complex.

Morphology
Members of Anchoromicrocotylinae are characterized by a symmetric haptor, with a sharp end that bears three pairs of larval hooks. The digestive system includes two oral suckers with papillary borders, a pharynx and an esophagus. The male genital system includes numerous testes located behind the ovary (post-ovarian testes), a vas deferens and a complex male copulatory organ, composed of: a male atrium, a penis, and a prostate vesicle. The female genital system include a complex  ovary, a genito-intestinal canal, an ootype, a uterus, and a single dorsal unarmed vagina.

Species
According to the World Register of Marine Species, there are two genera  in this subfamily:

References

Microcotylidae
Monogenea genera